The Bush Foundation was created in 1953 by Archibald Granville Bush an American businessman primarily involved with 3M and his wife, Edyth Bassler Bush. The organization awards $40 million a year to philanthropic organizations, primarily located in Minnesota and the Upper Midwest. The current president of the foundation is Jennifer Ford Reedy (appointed in July 2012), who previously worked on the Itasca Project and the GiveMN.org initiative at the Minnesota Philanthropy Partners.

References

External links

Charities based in Minnesota